Igor Sergeyevich Yanovsky (born 3 August 1974) is a Russian retired association football player.

He played for a few clubs, including Alania Vladikavkaz, Paris Saint-Germain (France), CSKA Moscow, and LB Châteauroux (France).

He played for Russia national football team and was a participant at the Euro 1996.He became the winner Cyprus International Football Tournament 2003 with the national team
.
Yanovsky announced his retirement on 27 July 2006 .

Playing career

* – played games and goals

Honours
 Russian Premier League winner in 1995, 2003
 Russian Cup winner in 2002

References

External links
 Profile at RussiaTeam 
 Career, statistic, goals

1974 births
Living people
Soviet footballers
Russian footballers
Russia under-21 international footballers
Russia international footballers
Russian expatriate footballers
FC Spartak Vladikavkaz players
Paris Saint-Germain F.C. players
Expatriate footballers in France
PFC CSKA Moscow players
LB Châteauroux players
Ligue 1 players
Russian Premier League players
UEFA Euro 1996 players
Sportspeople from Vladikavkaz
Association football defenders